Teodoro "Prisco" Alcalde Millos (20 September 1913 – 9 August 1995) was a Peruvian international football player. He was born in Callao as the second eldest of 3 brothers, with Victor Alcalde and Jorge "Campolo" Alcalde being the others. He played for the Peru national football team at the 1936 Summer Olympics in Berlin. He played for 7 other professional football teams in his career, which ended in 1951.

References

External links

1913 births
1995 deaths
Sportspeople from Callao
Footballers at the 1936 Summer Olympics
Olympic footballers of Peru
Peruvian footballers
Peruvian Primera División players
Association football forwards
Sport Boys footballers